The 1962 North Indian Ocean cyclone season had no official bounds, but cyclones tend to form between April and December. These dates conventionally delimit the period of each year when most tropical cyclones form in the northern Indian Ocean. There are two main seas in the North Indian Ocean—the Bay of Bengal to the east of the Indian subcontinent and the Arabian Sea to the west of India. The official Regional Specialized Meteorological Centre in this basin is the India Meteorological Department (IMD), while the Joint Typhoon Warning Center releases unofficial advisories. An average of four to six storms form in the North Indian Ocean every season with peaks in May and November. The IMD includes cyclones occurring between the meridians 45°E and 100°E in the season.

Systems

Cyclonic Storm One

Cyclonic Storm One existed from May 15 to May 22.

Deep Depression Two

Deep Depression Two existed from May 24 to May 25.

Depression Three

Depression Three existed from May 28 to May 30.

Depression Four

Depression Four existed from June 6 to June 8.

Deep Depression Five

Deep Depression Five existed from July 11 to July 13.

Depression Six

Depression Six existed from July 8 to July 15.

Deep Depression Seven

Deep Depression Seven existed from September 8 to September 15.

Deep Depression Eight

Deep Depression Eight existed from September 16 to September 21.

Cyclonic Storm Nine

Cyclonic Storm Nine existed from September 16 to September 21.

Deep Depression Ten

Deep Depression Ten existed from October 22 to October 26.

Severe Cyclonic Storm Harriet

After making landfall in Thailand, the system continued westward, then curved to the northeast, probably regathering strength and making landfall near Chittagong in East Pakistan on October 30 before rapidly dissipating.

The destruction from Tropical Storm Harriet took the lives of at least 769 residents of Thailand's southern provinces. Another 142 people were also deemed missing as of November 4, with over 252 severe injuries. Damage at the time was estimated to be over $34.5 million (1962 USD) to government buildings, agriculture, homes and fishing fleets.

In East Pakistan, the cyclone killed 50,000 people.

Severe Cyclonic Storm Twelve

Severe Cyclonic Storm Twelve developed on November 26. The system dissipated on November 29.

Severe Cyclonic Storm Thirteen

The final storm of the season, Severe Cyclonic Storm Thirteen, developed on December 9. It lasted four days, dissipating on December 13.

Season effects
This is a table of all storms in the 1962 North Indian Ocean cyclone season. It mentions all of the season's storms and their names, duration, peak intensities (according to the IMD storm scale), damage, and death totals. Damage and death totals include the damage and deaths caused when that storm was a precursor wave or extratropical low, and all of the damage figures are in 1962 USD.

|-
| One ||  || bgcolor=#| || bgcolor=#| || bgcolor=#| || None ||  None ||  None ||
|-
| Two ||  || bgcolor=#| || bgcolor=#| || bgcolor=#| || None ||  None ||  None ||
|-
| Three ||  || bgcolor=#| || bgcolor=#| || bgcolor=#| || None ||  None ||  None ||
|-
| Four ||  || bgcolor=#| || bgcolor=#| || bgcolor=#| || None ||  None ||  None ||
|-

See also

 North Indian Ocean tropical cyclone
 List of tropical cyclone records
 1962 Atlantic hurricane season
 1962 Pacific hurricane season
 1962 Pacific typhoon season
 Australian region cyclone seasons: 1961–62 1962–63
 South Pacific cyclone seasons: 1961–62 1962–63
 South-West Indian Ocean cyclone seasons: 1961–62 1962–63

References

External links
India Meteorological Department
Joint Typhoon Warning Center 

 
Tropical cyclones in India
1962 in India